Breakers is an Australian television series that aired on Network Ten from 2 February 1998 and 3 November 1999, producing 430 episodes

The series revolves around The Breakers building situated near Bondi Beach, and the lives of the people who work and live there. The building houses three businesses all run by the same family. Breaker's Modelling School is run by Paul Simmons, The Breaker, a local newspaper is run by Eve, Paul's ex-wife, and Kate's Cafe, run by Kate Markham, Eve's sister.

Australian Senator Karen Synon considered the depiction of Lucy Hill, in a lesbian relationship to be "inappropriate" given the program's afternoon timeslot, and requested the Australian Broadcasting Authority investigate if the show had breached broadcasting guidelines. The ABA told The Daily Telegraph that the storyline was "normal" and the show's PG rating was appropriate for the timeslot.

References

External links
Breakers at the National Film and Sound Archive
 

Network 10 original programming
Australian television soap operas
1998 Australian television series debuts
1999 Australian television series endings
Television shows set in Sydney
Television series by Screentime